Larry Todd (October 7, 1942 – October 17, 1990) was an American football running back in the American Football League (AFL) and National Football League (NFL) who played for the Oakland Raiders. He played college football for the Arizona State Sun Devils. Larry spent his post-football years working for the Alameda County Social Services department until his death from cancer in 1990.

References

1942 births
1990 deaths
American football running backs
Oakland Raiders players
Arizona State Sun Devils football players
Players of American football from Tennessee